Babadzhanian, is an Armenian surname. Notable people with the surname include:

Arno Babadzhanian (1921–1983), Soviet composer and pianist 
Hamazasp Babadzhanian (1906–1977), Soviet Armenian Marshal of armored forces

Armenian-language surnames